Ramsden is a hamlet in the English county of Worcestershire.

Ramsden is located due west of the town of Pershore. It lies on the Regional Cycle Route 46, connecting Pershore and Worcester.

References

Hamlets in Worcestershire